The Brussels–Charleroi Canal, also known as the Charleroi Canal amongst other similar names, is an important canal in Belgium. It runs from Charleroi, Wallonia, in the south to Brussels in the north.

The canal is part of a north–south axis of water transport in Belgium, whereby the north of France (via the Canal du Centre) including Lille and Dunkirk and important waterways in the south of Belgium including the Sambre valley and sillon industriel are linked to the port of Antwerp in the north, via the Brussels–Scheldt Maritime Canal, which meets the Brussels–Charleroi Canal at the Sainctelette area.

The Ronquières inclined plane is the most remarkable feature of the canal.

History

Early proposals

The idea of a waterway to serve the cities of Hainaut, linking them ultimately with Antwerp, was first put forward during the reign of Philip the Good, Duke of Burgundy (1396–1467). In 1436, an edict authorised the modification and deepening of the Senne River, though the project turned out to be more expensive than previously thought. The authorities of Mechelen, the sole city allowed to tax water transport on the Senne, protested extensively at the prospect of the construction of a parallel canal, and the project was abandoned.

During the 16th century, the prospect of a canal was renewed. In 1531, Emperor Charles V authorised the construction of a canal linking Charleroi and Willebroek, though work did not begin immediately. It was not until 1550 that Mary of Habsburg, Governor of the Netherlands, finally ordered work to begin. When work was finished in 1561, the canal linked Brussels to the Scheldt at Willebroek, though it did not continue south past Brussels.

As part of France from 1795 to 1815, proposals to build the canal were hampered by Napoleon's focus on waging expansionist wars.

Work begins

During the Industrial Revolution, coal saw a tremendous rise in economic importance. The Sambre and Marne valleys are quite rich in coal, and during the reign of King William I of the Netherlands (1813–1840), concrete plans to extend the canal were at last made.

The project was undertaken by A.J. Barthélemy, member of the lower chamber of the States-General of the Netherlands and adviser to the regent in Brussels. He proposed inclined planes be used instead of locks, but his idea was ahead of its time. An inclined plane is quicker, and wastes less water, than a flight of canal locks, but is more costly to install and run. Jean-François Gendebien, a very prominent Belgian politician (although Belgium was then called the Southern Netherlands and was not independent) supported the idea, though finances had the last say in the matter, resulting in locks being chosen over inclined planes.

Today's canal is actually the fourth version. The first version, built from 1827 to 1832, has a gauge of only . Ambitious enlargements began again with the lock at Flanders' Gate (Porte de Flandre) in Brussels, which was expanded to a gauge of 600–800 t (590–790 L/T/660–880 S/T).

The last major improvement to the canal was the addition of the Class IV, 1350 tonne inclined plane at Ronquières, just uphill of Lock #5 at Ittre.

Life around the canal

As Belgian industry began to flourish in the city of Brussels, the land surrounding the canal became increasingly important and diverse. Two very prominent trade routes crossed paths in the valley of Brussels along the waterways, bringing in large numbers of merchants to lower Brussels. One of the major trade routes was from the Rhineland to Flanders, while the other one was from Antwerp to Wallonia. This area along the water was a booming marketplace crucial to the up-rise of urbanisation, and in turn modernisation of the city.

After a period of rapid industrialisation that took place sometime between the 1750s and 1780s, life around the canal expanded at very high rates. The canal was state of the art; the connection of waterways and roads allowed this area to become a centre of activity. The growth of international and domestic trade coupled with an increase in capital investment from wealthy landowners and merchants produced tons of jobs in the canal area. After this, the city showed no signs of slowing down on its journey to becoming one of the most influential cities in all of Europe. By 1930, Brussels population was up to over 200,000, compared to an estimated 65,000 in the year 1700. During the early 1980s, the 25 neighbourhoods around the canal were home to one fifth of Brussels population. The surrounding area holds a sense of youth, as it contributes to Brussels having the youngest population of any city in Belgium.  The effects of this mass migration to the lower valley in Brussels can be seen in the diversity of cultures. As the trade economy along the waterways continued to grow, immigrants from all over Europe came to benefit off of the booming industries. It has been estimated that the population of immigrants grew from 7% of the total population in the early 1960s to 56% of the total population in the early 2000s.

Throughout Brussels history, life centered around the canal has been high energy and progressive. Political issues involving powerful European nations throughout history surely had an effect on the city as a whole, but through thick and thin the canal zone remained the heart and soul of the city dominated by no single culture.

Recent history
On 17 December 2005, the body of former Rwandan cabinet minister Juvénal Uwilingiyimana was found in the canal. He had gone missing on 21 November 2005, and when his body was found, it was naked and badly decomposed. Uwilingiyimana had been indicted by the International Criminal Tribunal for Rwanda for his participation in the 1994 Rwandan genocide. He had been meeting with ICTR officials, and many thought he was to testify against high-ranking officials from the former Hutu regime.

Ronquières inclined plane

It consists of two large caissons mounted on rails. It can carry one boat of 1,350 tonnes or many smaller boats within the same limits.

Eight cables per caisson running around winches at the top allow each caisson to be moved independently of the other.

The inclined plane, while still in use, is now being promoted as a tourist site.

Traffic
 1987 - Tonnage: 1 094 000 T - 3084 Barges
 1990 - Tonnage: 1 289 000 T - 3346 Barges
 2000 - Tonnage: 2 100 000 T - 3471 Barges
 2004 - Tonnage: 3 160 000 T - 5155 Barges
 2005 - Tonnage: 3 019 000 T - 4812 Barges
 2006 - Tonnage: 3 143 000 T - 5215 Barges

Photo gallery

References

Notes

Bibliography
  Sterling, A., Dambrain, M.: Le Canal de Charleroi à Bruxelles, témoin d'une tradition industrielle. Editions MET, 2001.

 

Canals opened in 1561
Canals opened in 1832
Canals in Brussels
Canals in Flanders
Canals in Wallonia
Canals in Flemish Brabant
Canals in Hainaut (province)
Canals in Walloon Brabant
1561 establishments in the Holy Roman Empire